The 2020 season was Ulsan Hyundai FC's 37th season in the K League 1 in South Korea. Ulsan Hyundai competed K League 1, FA Cup, AFC Champions League. Ulsan Hyundai played their first match on 9 May after the league was suspended during the COVID-19 pandemic.

Kits
Supplier: Hummel / Sponsor: 태화강 국가정원 현대오일뱅크 프리미엄 선박유 HYUNDAI S-T☆R / Rear sponsor: 현대중공업 현대건설기계 / Sleeve Partner: HYUNDAI S-T☆R ULSAN / Champions League Partner: Hyundai Oilbank

Management team

Squad

Current squad

Transfers

Released

Loans out

Transfers in

Transfers out

Friendlies

Competitions

Overview

K League 1

League table

Results summary

Results by round

Matches
All times are Korea Standard Time (KST) – UTC+9

FA Cup

AFC Champions League

Ulsan Hyundai qualified for the Champions League group stage as the runners-up of the 2019 K League 1 season. They were drawn in Group F with FC Tokyo, Perth Glory and Shanghai Shenhua. As the group winners, they advanced to the knockout stage, where they eliminated Melbourne Victory in the round of 16, Beijing FC in the quarter-finals, and Vissel Kobe in the semi-finals, respectively. In the final, held on 19 December 2020 in Al Wakrah, Qatar, they defeated Iranian side Persepolis 2–1 with a brace by Júnior Negrão to win their second Champions League title, and first since 2012.

Group stage

Knockout stage

Round of 16

Quarter-finals

Semi-finals

Final

Statistics

Appearances

|-
! colspan=14 style=background:#dcdcdc; text-align:center| Goalkeepers

|-
! colspan=14 style=background:#dcdcdc; text-align:center| Defenders

|-
! colspan=14 style=background:#dcdcdc; text-align:center| Midfielders

|-
! colspan=14 style=background:#dcdcdc; text-align:center| A player who left the club on loan during the season.

|}

Goal scorers
The list is sorted by shirt number when total goals are equal.

Goal assists
The list is sorted by shirt number when total goals are equal.

Clean sheets
The list is sorted by shirt number when total clean sheets are equal.

Hat-tricks

(H) – Home ; (A) – Away

Disciplinary record

Notes

References

Ulsan Hyundai FC
Ulsan Hyundai FC seasons